Varavi Rural District is a rural district (dehestan) in Varavi District, Mohr County, Fars Province, Iran. At the 2006 census, its population was 3,463, in 716 families.  The rural district has 5 villages.

References 

Rural Districts of Fars Province
Mohr County